Faucaria tuberculosa, called warty tiger jaws, is a species of flowering plant in the genus Faucaria, native to southern Cape Provinces of South Africa. A succulent, it has gained the Royal Horticultural Society's Award of Garden Merit.

References

Aizoaceae
Endemic flora of South Africa
Flora of the Cape Provinces
Plants described in 1926